Princess is a 2010 Finnish biographical film directed by Arto Halonen and based on the life of .

Plot
After a difficult childhood spent in foster homes, cabaret dancer Anna Lappalainen (Katja Kukkola) suffers from severe delusions and ends up in psychiatric care. She claims to be Princess, a member of the English royal family.

Cast 
 Katja Küttner – 
 Samuli Edelmann – Johan Grotenfelt
 Krista Kosonen – Christina Von Heyroth
 Peter Franzén – Saastamoinen
 Pirkka-Pekka Petelius – Dean Kuronen
  – Doctor Alfred Lonka
 Antti Litja – Chief Physician Soininen
  – Head Nurse Pakalén
 Paula Vesala – Nurse Elsa
 Joanna Haartti – Nurse Rauha

References

External links 

2010s biographical films
Finnish biographical films
2010s Finnish-language films